The Magellan expedition, also known as the Magellan–Elcano expedition,  was the first voyage around the world. It was a 16th-century Spanish expedition initially led by Portuguese explorer Ferdinand Magellan to the Moluccas, which departed from Spain in 1519, and completed in 1522 by Spanish navigator Juan Sebastián Elcano, after crossing the Atlantic, Pacific and Indian oceans, culminating in the first circumnavigation of the world.

The expedition accomplished its primary goalto find a western route to the Moluccas (Spice Islands). The fleet left Spain on 20 September 1519, sailed across the Atlantic ocean and down the eastern coast of South America, eventually discovering the Strait of Magellan, allowing them to pass through to the Pacific Ocean (which Magellan named). The fleet completed the first Pacific crossing, stopping in the Philippines, and eventually reached the Moluccas after two years. A much-depleted crew led by Juan Sebastián Elcano finally returned to Spain on 6 September 1522, having sailed west across the great Indian Ocean, then around the Cape of Good Hope through waters controlled by the Portuguese and north along the West African coast to eventually arrive in Spain.

The fleet initially consisted of five ships and about 270 men. The expedition faced numerous hardships including Portuguese sabotage attempts, mutinies, starvation, scurvy, storms, and hostile encounters with indigenous people. Only 30 men and one ship (the Victoria) completed the return trip to Spain. Magellan himself died in battle in the Philippines, and was succeeded as captain-general by a series of officers, with Elcano eventually leading the Victorias return trip.

The expedition was funded mostly by King Charles I of Spain, with the hope that it would discover a profitable western route to the Moluccas, as the eastern route was controlled by Portugal under the Treaty of Tordesillas. Though the expedition did find a route, it was much longer and more arduous than expected, and was therefore not commercially useful. Nevertheless, the expedition is regarded as one of the greatest achievements in seamanship, and had a significant impact on the European understanding of the world.

Background

Christopher Columbus's voyages to the West (1492–1503) had the goal of reaching the Indies and establishing direct commercial relations between Spain and the Asian kingdoms. The Spanish soon realized that the lands of the Americas were not a part of Asia, but another continent. The 1494 Treaty of Tordesillas reserved for Portugal the eastern routes that went around Africa, and Vasco da Gama and the Portuguese arrived in India in 1498.

Given the economic importance of the spice trade, Castile (Spain) urgently needed to find a new commercial route to Asia. After the Junta de Toro conference of 1505, the Spanish Crown commissioned expeditions to discover a route to the west. Spanish explorer Vasco Núñez de Balboa reached the Pacific Ocean in 1513 after crossing the Isthmus of Panama, and Juan Díaz de Solís died in Río de la Plata in 1516 while exploring South America in the service of Spain.

Ferdinand Magellan was a Portuguese sailor with previous military experience in India, Malacca, and Morocco. A friend, and possible cousin, with whom Magellan sailed, Francisco Serrão, was part of the first expedition to the Moluccas, leaving from Malacca in 1511. Serrão reached the Moluccas, going on to stay on the island of Ternate and take a wife. Serrão sent letters to Magellan from Ternate, extolling the beauty and richness of the Spice Islands. These letters likely motivated Magellan to plan an expedition to the islands, and would later be presented to Spanish officials when Magellan sought their sponsorship.

Historians speculate that, beginning in 1514, Magellan repeatedly petitioned King Manuel I of Portugal to fund an expedition to the Moluccas, though records are unclear. It is known that Manuel repeatedly denied Magellan's requests for a token increase to his pay, and that in late 1515 or early 1516, Manuel granted Magellan's request to be allowed to serve another master. Around this time, Magellan met the cosmographer Rui Faleiro, another Portuguese subject nursing resentment towards Manuel. The two men acted as partners in planning a voyage to the Moluccas which they would propose to the king of Spain. Magellan relocated to Seville, Spain in 1517, with Faleiro following two months later.

On arrival in Seville, Magellan contacted Juan de Aranda, factor of the Casa de Contratación. Following the arrival of his partner Rui Faleiro, and with the support of Aranda, they presented their project to the king Charles I of Castile and Aragon (future Holy Roman Emperor Charles V). Magellan's project, if successful, would realise Columbus' plan of a spice route by sailing west without damaging relations with the Portuguese. The idea was in tune with the times and had already been discussed after Balboa's discovery of the Pacific. On 22 March 1518, the king named Magellan and Faleiro captains so that they could travel in search of the Spice Islands in July. He raised them to the rank of Commander of the Order of Santiago. They reached an agreement with King Charles which granted them, among other things:
 Monopoly of the discovered route for a period of ten years.
 Their appointment as governors (adelantado) of the lands and islands found, with 5% of the resulting net gains, inheritable by their partners or heirs.
 A fifth of the gains from the expedition.
 The right to ship 1,000 ducats worth of goods from the Mollucas to Spain annually exempt from most taxes.
 In the event that they discovered more than six islands, one fifteenth of the trading profits with two of their choice, and a twenty-fifth from the others.

The expedition was funded largely by the Spanish Crown, which provided ships carrying supplies for two years of travel. Though King Charles I was supposed to pay for the fleet he was deeply in debt, and he turned to the House of Fugger. Through archbishop Juan Rodríguez de Fonseca, head of the Casa de Contratación, the Crown obtained the participation of merchant Cristóbal de Haro, who provided a quarter of the funds and goods to barter.

Expert cartographers Jorge Reinel and Diego Ribero, a Portuguese who had started working for King Charles in 1518 as a cartographer at the Casa de Contratación, took part in the development of the maps to be used in the travel. Several problems arose during the preparation of the trip, including lack of money, the king of Portugal trying to stop them, Magellan and other Portuguese incurring suspicion from the Spanish, and the difficult nature of Faleiro.

Construction and provisions
The fleet, consisting of five ships with supplies for two years of travel, was called Armada del Maluco, after the Indonesian name for the Spice Islands. The ships were mostly black, due to the tar covering most of their surface. The official accounting of the expedition put the cost at 8,751,125 maravedis, including the ships, provisions, and salaries.

Food was a hugely important part of the provisioning. It cost 1,252,909 maravedis, almost as much as the cost of the ships. Four-fifths of the food on the ship consisted of just two items – wine and hardtack.

The fleet also carried flour and salted meat. Some of the ships' meat came in the form of livestock; the ship carried seven cows and three pigs. Cheese, almonds, mustard, and figs were also present. , made from preserved quince, was a delicacy enjoyed by captains which may have unknowingly aided in the prevention of scurvy.

Ships

The fleet initially consisted of five ships, with Trinidad being the flagship. All or most were carracks (Spanish "carraca" or "nao"; Portuguese "nau"). The Victoria was the only ship to complete the circumnavigation. Details of the ships' configuration are not known, as no contemporary illustrations exist of any of the ships. The official accounting of the Casa de Contratación put the cost of the ships at 1,369,808 maravedis, with another 1,346,781 spent on outfitting and transporting them.

Crew
The crew consisted of about 270 men, mostly Spaniards. Spanish authorities were wary of Magellan, so that they almost prevented him from sailing, switching his mostly Portuguese crew to mostly men of Spain. In the end, the fleet included about 40 Portuguese, among them Magellan's brother-in-law Duarte Barbosa, João Serrão, Estêvão Gomes and Magellan's indentured servant Enrique of Malacca. Crew members of other nations were also recorded, including 29 Italians, 17 French, and a smaller number of Flemish, Greek, Irish, English, Asian, and black sailors. Counted among the Spanish crew members were at least 29 Basques (including Juan Sebastián Elcano), some of whom did not speak Spanish fluently.

Ruy Faleiro, who had initially been named co-captain with Magellan, developed mental health problems prior to departure and was removed from the expedition by the king. He was replaced as the fleet's joint commander by Juan de Cartagena and as cosmographer/astrologer by Andrés de San Martín.

Juan Sebastián Elcano, a Spanish merchant ship captain living in Seville, embarked seeking the king's pardon for previous misdeeds. Antonio Pigafetta, a Venetian scholar and traveller, asked to be on the voyage, accepting the title of "supernumerary" and a modest salary. He became a strict assistant of Magellan and kept a journal. The only other sailor to keep a running account during the voyage would be Francisco Albo, who kept a formal nautical logbook.
Juan de Cartagena, suspected illegitimate son of archbishop Fonseca, was named Inspector General of the expedition, responsible for its financial and trading operations.

Crossing the Atlantic
On 10 August 1519, the five ships under Magellan's command left Seville and descended the Guadalquivir River to Sanlúcar de Barrameda, at the mouth of the river. There they remained more than five weeks. Finally they set sail on 20 September 1519 and left Spain.

On 26 September, the fleet stopped at Tenerife in the Canary Islands, where they took in supplies (including vegetable and pitch, which were cheaper to acquire there than in Spain). During the stop, Magellan received a secret message from his father-in-law, Diogo Barbosa, warning him that some of the Castilian captains were planning a mutiny, with Juan de Cartagena (captain of the San Antonio) being the ring-leader of the conspiracy. He also learned that the King of Portugal had sent two fleets of caravels to arrest him.

On 3 October, the fleet departed the Canary Islands, sailing south along the coast of Africa. There was some disagreement over directions, with Cartagena arguing for a more westerly bearing. Magellan made the unorthodox decision to follow the African coast in order to evade the Portuguese caravels which were pursuing him.

Toward the end of October, as the Armada approached the equator, they experienced a series of storms, with such intense squalls that they were sometimes forced to strike their sails. Pigafetta recorded the appearance of St. Elmo's fire during some of these storms, which was regarded as a good omen by the crew:

During these storms the body of St. Anselme appeared to us several times; amongst others, one night that it was very dark on account of the bad weather, the said saint appeared in the form of a fire lighted at the summit of the mainmast, and remained there near two hours and a half, which comforted us greatly, for we were in tears, only expecting the hour of perishing; and when that holy light was going away from us it gave out so great a brilliancy in the eyes of each, that we were near a quarter-of-an-hour like people blinded, and calling out for mercy. For without any doubt nobody hoped to escape from that storm.

After two weeks of storms, the fleet spent some time stalled in calm, equatorial waters before being carried west by the South Equatorial Current to the vicinity of the trade winds.

Sodomy trial and failed mutiny
During the ocean crossing, the Victorias boatswain, Antonio Salamón was caught in an act of sodomy with a cabin boy, Antonio Ginovés. At the time, homosexuality was punishable by death in Spain, though in practice, sex between men was a common occurrence on long naval voyages. Magellan held a trial on board the Trinidad and found Salamón guilty, sentencing him to death by strangulation. Salamón was later executed on 20 December, after the fleet's landfall in Brazil. The fate of Ginovés is unclear, with some accounts saying that he was thrown overboard, and others claiming that taunts from his fellow sailors drove him to commit suicide by jumping overboard.

In a meeting following the trial, Magellan's captains challenged his leadership. Cartagena accused Magellan of risking the King's ships by his choice of route, sailing South along the African coast. When Cartagena declared that he would no longer follow Magellan's command, Magellan gave the signal for a number of armed loyalists to enter the room and take hold of Cartagena. Magellan called Cartagena a "rebel" and branded his behaviour as mutinous. Cartagena called on the other two Castilian captains (Quesada and Mendoza) to stab Magellan, but they held back.

Immediately following the episode, Cartagena was placed in stocks. Magellan could have tried Cartagena for mutiny and sentenced him to death, but at the urging of Quesada and Mendoza, he agreed to merely relieve Cartagena of his command of the San Antonio, and allow him to move freely within the confines of the Victoria. Antonio de Coca replaced Cartagena as captain of the San Antonio.

Passage through South America
Arrival in Brazil

On 29 November, the fleet reached the approximate latitude of Cape Saint Augustine. The coastline of Brazil (which Pigafetta refers to as Verzin in his diary, after the Italian term for brazilwood) had been known to the Spanish and Portuguese since about 1500, and in the intervening decades, European powers (particularly Portugal) had been sending ships to Brazil to collect valuable brazilwood. The Armada carried a map of the Brazilian coastline, the Livro da Marinharia (the "Book of the Sea"), and also had a crew member, the Concepcións pilot, João Lopes Carvalho, who had previously visited Rio de Janeiro. Carvalho was enlisted to lead the fleet's navigation down the Brazilian coastline to Rio, aboard the Trinidad, and also helped communicate with the locals, as he had some rudimentary knowledge of their Guarani language.

On 13 December, the fleet reached Rio de Janeiro. Though nominally Portuguese territory, they maintained no permanent settlement there at the time. Seeing no Portuguese ships in the harbour, Magellan knew it would be safe to stop. Pigafetta wrote of a coincidence of weather that caused the armada to be warmly received by the indigenous people:

It is to be known that it happened that it had not rained for two months before we came there, and the day that we arrived it began to rain, on which account the people of the said place said that we came from heaven, and had brought the rain with us, which was great simplicity, and these people were easily converted to the Christian faith.

The fleet spent 13 days in Rio, during which they repaired their ships, stocked up on water and food (such as yam, cassava, and pineapple), and interacted with the locals. The expedition had brought with them a great quantity of trinkets intended for trade, such as mirrors, combs, knives and bells. The locals readily exchanged food and local goods (such as parrot feathers) for such items. The crew also found they could purchase sexual favours from the local women. Historian Ian Cameron described the crew's time in Rio as "a saturnalia of feasting and lovemaking".

On 27 December, the fleet left Rio de Janeiro. Pigafetta wrote that the natives were disappointed to see them leave, and that some followed them in canoes trying to entice them to stay.

Río de la Plata
The fleet sailed south along the South American coast, hoping to reach el paso, the fabled strait that would allow them passage past South America to the Spice Islands. On 11 January, a headland marked by three hills was sighted, which the crew believed to be "Cape Santa Maria". Around the headland, they found a wide body of water that extended as far as the eye could see in a west-by-southwest direction. Magellan believed he had found el paso, though in fact he had reached the Río de la Plata. Magellan directed the Santiago, commanded by Juan Serrano, to probe the 'strait', and led the other ships south hoping to find Terra Australis, the southern continent which was then widely supposed to exist south of South America. They failed to find the southern continent, and when they regrouped with the Santiago a few days later, Serrano reported that the hoped-for strait was in fact the mouth of a river. Incredulous, Magellan led the fleet through the western waters again, taking frequent soundings. Serrano's claim was confirmed when the men eventually found themselves in fresh water.

Search for strait
On 3 February, the fleet continued south along the South American coast. Magellan believed they would find a strait (or the southern terminus of the continent) within a short distance. In fact, the fleet would sail south for another eight weeks without finding passage, before stopping to overwinter at St. Julian.

Not wanting to miss the strait, the fleet sailed as close to the coast as feasible, heightening the danger of running aground on shoals. The ships sailed only during the day, with lookouts carefully watching the coast for signs of a passage. In addition to the hazards of shallow waters, the fleet encountered squalls, storms, and dropping temperatures as they continued south and winter set in.

Overwintering
By the third week of March, weather conditions had become so desperate that Magellan decided they should find a safe harbour in which to wait out the winter, and resume the search for a passage in spring. On 31 March 1520, a break in the coast was spotted. There, the fleet found a natural harbour which they called Port St. Julian.

The men remained at St. Julian for five months, before resuming their search for the strait.

Easter mutiny

Within a day of landing at St. Julian, there was another mutiny attempt. Like the one during the Atlantic crossing, it was led by Juan de Cartagena (former captain of the San Antonio), aided by Gaspar de Quesada and Luis Mendoza, captains of the Concepción and Victoria, respectively. As before, the Castilian captains questioned Magellan's leadership, and accused him of recklessly endangering the fleet's crew and ships.

The mutiny at St. Julian was more calculated than the fracas that had followed the sodomy trial during the Atlantic crossing. Around midnight of Easter Sunday, 1 April, Cartagena and Quesada covertly led thirty armed men, their faces covered with charcoal, aboard the San Antonio, where they ambushed Álvaro de Mezquita, the recently named captain of the ship. Mezquita was Magellan's cousin, and sympathetic to the captain general. Juan de Elorriaga, the ship's boatswain, resisted the mutineers and attempted to alert the other ships. For this reason, Quesada stabbed him repeatedly (he would die from his wounds months later).

With the San Antonio subdued, the mutineers controlled three of the fleet's five ships. Only the Santiago (commanded by Juan Serrano) remained loyal to Magellan, along with the flag ship, the Trinidad, which Magellan commanded. The mutineers aimed the San Antonio'''s cannon at the Trinidad, but made no further overtures during the night.

The following morning (2 April), while the mutineers attempted to consolidate their forces aboard the San Antonio and the Victoria, a longboat of sailors drifted off course into the vicinity of the Trinidad. The men were brought aboard and persuaded to divulge the details of the mutineers' plans to Magellan.

Magellan subsequently launched a counteroffensive against the mutineers aboard the Victoria. He had some marines from the Trinidad switch clothing with the stray sailors, and approach the Victoria in their longboat. His alguacil, Gonzalo de Espinosa, also approached the Victoria in a skiff, and announced that he had a message for the captain, Luis Mendoza. Espinosa was allowed aboard, and into the captain's chambers, based on his claim that he had a confidential letter. There, Espinosa stabbed Mendoza in the throat with his poignard, killing him instantly. At the same time, the disguised marines came aboard the Victoria to support the alguacil.

With the Victoria lost and Mendoza dead, the remaining mutineers realised they were outmanoeuvred. Cartagena conceded and begged Magellan for mercy. Quesada attempted to flee, but was prevented from doing so – sailors loyal to Magellan had cut the San Antonios cables, causing it to drift toward the Trinidad, and Cartagena was captured.

Mutiny trial
The trial of the mutineers was headed by Magellan's cousin Álvaro de Mezquita and lasted five days. On 7 April, Quesada was beheaded by his foster-brother and secretary, Luis Molina, who acted as executioner in exchange for clemency. The bodies of Quesada and Mendoza were drawn and quartered and displayed on gibbets for the following three months. San Martín, suspected of involvement in the conspiracy, was tortured by strappado, but afterwards was allowed to continue his service as cosmographer. Cartagena, along with a priest, Pedro Sanchez de Reina, were sentenced to be marooned. On 11 August, two weeks before the fleet left St. Julian, the two were taken to a small nearby island and left to die. More than forty other conspirators, including Juan Sebastián Elcano, were put in chains for much of the winter and made to perform the hard work of careening the ships, repairing their structure and scrubbing the bilge.

Loss of Santiago
In late April, Magellan dispatched the Santiago, captained by Juan Serrano, from St. Julian to scout to the south for a strait. On 3 May, they reached the estuary of a river which Serrano named Santa Cruz River. The estuary provided shelter and was well situated with natural resources including fish, penguins, and wood.

After more than a week exploring Santa Cruz, Serrano set out to return to St. Julian on 22 May, but was caught in a sudden storm while leaving the harbour. The Santiago was tossed about by strong winds and currents before running aground on a sandbar. All (or nearly all) of the crew were able to clamber ashore before the ship capsized. Two men volunteered to set off on foot for St. Julian to get help. After 11 days of hard trekking, the men arrived at St. Julian, exhausted and emaciated. Magellan sent a rescue party of 24 men over land to Santa Cruz.

The other 35 survivors from the Santiago remained at Santa Cruz for two weeks. They were unable to retrieve any supplies from the wreck of the Santiago, but managed to build huts and fire, and subsist on a diet of shellfish and local vegetation. The rescue party found them all alive but exhausted, and they returned to St. Julian safely.

Move to Santa Cruz
After learning of the favourable conditions that Serrano found at Santa Cruz, Magellan decided to move the fleet there for the rest of the austral winter. After almost four months at St. Julian, the fleet left for Santa Cruz around 24 August. They spent six weeks at Santa Cruz before resuming their search for the strait.

Strait of Magellan

On 18 October, the fleet left Santa Cruz heading south, resuming their search for a passage. Soon after, on 21 October 1520, they spotted a headland at 52°S latitude which they named Cape Virgenes. Past the cape, they found a large bay. While they were exploring the bay, a storm erupted. The Trinidad and Victoria made it out to open seas, but the Concepción and San Antonio were driven deeper into the bay, toward a promontory. Three days later, the fleet was reunited, and the Concepción and San Antonio reported that the storm drew them through a narrow passage, not visible from sea, which continued for some distance. Hoping they had finally found their sought-after strait, the fleet retraced the path taken by the Concepción and San Antonio. Unlike at Río de la Plata earlier, the water did not lose its salinity as they progressed, and soundings indicated that the waters were consistently deep. This was the passage they sought, which would come to be known as the Strait of Magellan.

On 28 October, the fleet reached an island in the strait (likely Isabel Island or Dawson Island), which could be passed in one of two directions. Magellan directed the fleet to split up to explore the respective paths. They were meant to regroup within a few days, but the San Antonio would never rejoin the fleet. While the rest of the fleet waited for the return of the San Antonio, Gonzalo de Espinosa led a small ship to explore the further reaches of the strait. After three days of sailing, they reached the end of the strait and the mouth of the Pacific Ocean. After another three days, Espinosa returned. Pigafetta writes that, on hearing the news of Espinosa's discovery, Magellan wept tears of joy. The fleet's remaining three ships completed the journey to the Pacific by 28 November, after weeks of fruitlessly searching for the San Antonio. Magellan named the waters the Mar Pacifico (Pacific Ocean) because of its apparent stillness.

Desertion of San Antonio

The San Antonio failed to rejoin the rest of Magellan's fleet in the strait. At some point, they reversed course and sailed back to Spain. The ship's officers later testified that they had arrived early at the appointed rendezvous location, but it's not clear whether this is true. The pilot of the San Antonio at the time, Álvaro de Mezquita, was Magellan's cousin and loyal to the captain-general. He directed attempts to rejoin the fleet, firing cannons and setting off smoke signals. At some point he was overpowered in yet another mutiny attempt, this one successful. He was stabbed by the pilot of the San Antonio, Estêvão Gomes, and put in chains for the remainder of the journey. Gomes was known to have feelings of animosity towards Magellan (as documented by Pigafetta, who wrote that "Gomes... hated the Captain General exceedingly", because he had hoped to have his own expedition to the Moluccas funded instead of Magellan's), and shortly before the fleet was separated, had argued with him about their next course of action. While Magellan and the other officers agreed to continue west to the Moluccas, thinking that their 2–3 months of rations would be sufficient for the journey, Gomes argued that they should return to Spain the way they had come, to muster more supplies for another journey through the strait.

The San Antonio reached Seville approximately six months later, on 8 May 1521, with 55 survivors. There ensued a trial of the ship's men which lasted six months. With Mezquita being the only one loyal to Magellan, the majority of testimony produced a villainous and distorted picture of Magellan's actions. In particular, in justifying the mutiny at St. Julian, the men claimed that Magellan had tortured Spanish seamen (during the return journey across the Atlantic, Mezquita was tortured into signing a statement to this effect) and claimed that they were merely trying to make Magellan follow the king's orders. Ultimately, none of the mutineers faced charges in Spain. Magellan's reputation suffered as a result, as did his friends and family. Mezquita was kept in jail for a year following the trial, and Magellan's wife, Beatriz, had her financial resources cut off, and was placed under house arrest, along with their son.

Pacific crossing

Magellan (along with contemporary geographers) had no conception of the vastness of the Pacific Ocean. He imagined that South America was separated from the Spice Islands by a small sea, which he expected to cross in as little as three or four days. In fact, they spent three months and twenty days at sea, before reaching Guam and then the Philippines.

The fleet entered the Pacific from the Strait of Magellan on 28 November 1520, and initially sailed north, following the coast of Chile. By mid-December, they altered their course to west-north-west. They were unfortunate in that, had their course differed slightly, they might have encountered a number of Pacific islands which would have offered fresh food and water, such as the Marshall Islands, the Society Islands, the Solomon Islands or the Marquesas Islands. As it was, they encountered only two small uninhabited islands during the crossing, at which they were unable to land, the reason why they named them islas Infortunadas. The first, sighted 24 January, they named San Pablo (likely Puka-Puka). The second, which they sighted 21 February, was likely Caroline Island. They crossed the equator on 13 February.

Not expecting such a long journey, the ships were not stocked with adequate food and water, and much of the seal meat they had stocked putrefied in the equatorial heat. Pigafetta described the desperate conditions in his journal:

we only ate old biscuit reduced to powder, and full of grubs, and stinking from the dirt which the rats had made on it when eating the good biscuit, and we drank water that was yellow and stinking. We also ate the ox hides which were under the main-yard, so that the yard should not break the rigging: they were very hard on account of the sun, rain, and wind, and we left them for four or five days in the sea, and then we put them a little on the embers, and so ate them; also the sawdust of wood, and rats which cost half-a-crown each, moreover enough of them were not to be got.

Moreover, most of the men suffered from symptoms of scurvy, whose cause was not understood at the time. Pigafetta reported that, of the 166 men who embarked on the Pacific crossing, 19 died and "twenty-five or thirty fell ill of diverse sicknesses". Magellan, Pigafetta, and other officers were not afflicted with scorbutic symptoms, which may have been because they ate preserved quince which (unbeknownst to them) contained the vitamin C necessary to protect against scurvy.

Guam and the Philippines
On 6 March 1521, the fleet reached the Mariana Islands. The first land they spotted was likely the island of Rota, but the ships were unable to land there, and instead dropped anchor thirty hours later on Guam. They were met by native Chamorro people in proas, a type of outrigger canoe then unknown to Europeans. Dozens of Chamorros came aboard and began taking items from the ship, including rigging, knives, and any items made of iron. At some point, there was a physical confrontation between the crew and the natives, and at least one Chamorro was killed. The remaining natives fled with the goods they had obtained, also taking Magellan's bergantina (the ship's boat kept on the Trinidad) as they retreated. For this act, Magellan called the island Isla de los Ladrones (Island of Thieves).

The next day, Magellan retaliated, sending a raiding party ashore which looted and burned forty or fifty Chammoro houses and killed seven men. They recovered the bergantina and left Guam the next day, 9 March, continuing westward.

The Philippines
The fleet reached the Philippines on 16 March, and remained there until 1 May. The expedition represented the first documented European contact with the Philippines. Though the stated goal of Magellan's expedition was to find a passage through South America to the Moluccas, and return to Spain laden with spices, at this point in the journey, Magellan seemed to acquire a zeal for converting the local tribes to Christianity. In doing so, Magellan eventually became embroiled in a local political dispute, and died in the Philippines, along with dozens of other officers and crew.

On 16 March, a week after leaving Guam, the fleet first sighted the island of Samar, then landed on the island of Homonhon, which was then uninhabited. They encountered friendly locals from the nearby island of Suluan and traded supplies with them. They spent nearly two weeks on Homonhon, resting and gathering fresh food and water, before leaving on 27 March. On the morning of 28 March, they neared the island of Limasawa, and encountered some natives in canoes who then alerted balangay warships of two local rulers from Mindanao who were on a hunting expedition in Limasawa. For the first time on the journey, Magellan's slave Enrique of Malacca found that he was able to communicate with the natives in Malay (an indication that they had indeed completed a circumnavigation, and were approaching familiar lands). They exchanged gifts with the natives (receiving porcelain jars painted with Chinese designs), and later that day were introduced to their leaders, Rajah Kolambu and Rajah Siawi. Magellan would become a "blood brother" to Kolambu, undergoing the local blood compact ritual with him.

Magellan and his men noted that the Rajahs had golden body ornaments and served food on golden plates. They were told by the Rajahs that gold was plentiful in their homelands in Butuan and Calagan (Surigao), and found that the locals were eager to trade it for iron at par. While at Limasawa, Magellan gave some of the natives a demonstration of Spanish armour, weapons, and artillery, by which they were apparently impressed.

First mass

On Sunday 31 March, Easter Day, Magellan and fifty of his men came ashore to Limasawa to participate in the first Catholic Mass in the Philippines, given by the armada's chaplain. Kolambu, his brother (who was also a local leader), and other islanders joined in the ceremony, and expressed an interest in their religion. Following Mass, Magellan's men raised a cross on the highest hill on the island, and formally declared the island, and the entire archipelago of the Philippines (which he called the Islands of St Lazarus) as a possession of Spain.

Cebu
On 2 April, Magellan held a conference to decide the fleet's next course of action. His officers urged him to head south-west for the Mollucas, but instead he decided to press further into the Philippines. On 3 April, the fleet sailed north-west from Limasawa towards the island of Cebu, which Magellan learned of from Kolambu. The fleet was guided to Cebu by some of Kolambu's men. They sighted Cebu 6 April, and made landfall the next day. Cebu had regular contact with Chinese and Arab traders and normally required that visitors pay tribute in order to trade. Magellan convinced the island's leader, Rajah Humabon, to waive this requirement.

As he had in Limasawa, Magellan gave a demonstration of the fleet's arms in order to impress the locals. Again, he also preached Christianity to the natives, and on 14 April, Humabon and his family were baptised and given an image of the Holy Child (later known as Santo Niño de Cebu). In the coming days, other local chieftains were baptised, and in total, 2,200 locals from Cebu and other nearby islands were converted.

When Magellan learned that a group on the island of Mactan, led by Lapu-Lapu, resisted Christian conversion, he ordered his men to burn their homes. When they continued to resist, Magellan informed his council on 26 April that he would bring an armed contingent to Mactan and make them submit under threat of force.

Battle of Mactan

Magellan mustered a force of 60 armed men from his crew to oppose Lapu-Lapu's forces. Some Cebuano men followed Magellan to Mactan, but were instructed by Magellan not to join the fight, but merely to watch. He first sent an envoy to Lapu-Lapu, offering him a last chance to accept the king of Spain as their ruler, and avoid bloodshed. Lapu-Lapu refused. Magellan took 49 men to the shore while 11 remained to guard the boats. Though they had the benefit of relatively advanced armour and weaponry, Magellan's forces were greatly outnumbered. Pigafetta (who was present on the battlefield) estimated the enemy's number at 1,500. Magellan's forces were driven back and decisively defeated. Magellan died in battle, along with several comrades, including Cristóvão Rebelo, Magellan's illegitimate son.

1 May Massacre
Following Magellan's death, the remaining men held an election to select a new leader for the expedition. They selected two co-commanders: Duarte Barbosa, Magellan's brother-in-law, and Juan Serrano. Magellan's will called for the liberation of his slave, Enrique, but Barbosa and Serrano demanded that he continue his duties as an interpreter for them, and follow their orders. Enrique had some secret communication with Humabon which caused him to betray the Spaniards.

On 1 May, Humabon invited the men ashore for a great feast. It was attended by around thirty men, mostly officers, including Serrano and Barbosa. Towards the end of the meal, armed Cebuanos entered the hall and murdered the Europeans. Twenty-seven men were killed. Juan Serrano, one of the newly elected co-commanders, was left alive and brought to the shore facing the Spanish ships. Serrano begged the men on board to pay a ransom to the Cebuanos. The Spanish ships left port, and Serrano was (presumably) killed. In his account, Pigafetta speculates that João Carvalho, who became first in command in the absence of Barbosa and Serrano, abandoned Serrano (his one-time friend) so that he could remain in command of the fleet.

Moluccas
With just 115 surviving men, out of the 277 who had sailed from Seville, it was decided the fleet did not have enough men to continue operating three ships. On 2 May, the Concepción was emptied and set on fire. With Carvalho as the new captain-general, the remaining two ships, the Trinidad and Victoria, spent the next six months meandering through Southeast Asia in search of the Moluccas. On the way, they stopped at several islands including Mindanao and Brunei. During this time, they engaged in acts of piracy, including robbing a junk bound for China from the Moluccas.

On 21 September, Carvalho was made to step down as captain-general. He was replaced by Martin Mendez, with Gonzalo de Espinosa and Juan Sebastián Elcano as captains of the Trinidad and Victoria, respectively.

Aganduru Moriz' account of the expedition describes how Elcano's crew was attacked somewhere off the southeastern tip of Borneo by a Bruneian fleet commanded by one of the Luzones. Historians such as William Henry Scott and Luis Camara Dery assert that this commander of the Bruneian Fleet was actually the young prince Ache of Maynila (Manila) a grandson of the Bruneian sultan who would later become Maynila's Rajah Matanda.

Elcano, however, was able to defeat and capture Ache.  According to Scott, Ache was eventually released after a ransom was paid. Nevertheless, Ache left a Spanish speaking Moor in Elcano's crew to assist the ship on the way back to Spain, "a Moor who understood something of our Castilian language, 
who was called Pazeculan." This knowledge of the Spanish language was scattered across the Indian Ocean and even into Southeast Asia after the Castilian conquest of the Emirate of Granada forced the Spanish speaking Granadan Muslims to migrate across the Muslim world even as far as Islamic Manila.

The ships finally reached the Moluccas on 8 November, when they reached the island of Tidore. They were greeted by the island's leader, al-Mansur (known to the officers by the Spanish name Almanzor). Almanzor was a friendly host to the men, and readily claimed loyalty to the king of Spain. A trading post was established in Tidore and the men set about purchasing massive quantities of cloves in exchange for goods such as cloth, knives, and glassware.

Around 15 December, the ships attempted to set sail from Tidore, laden with cloves. But the Trinidad, which had fallen into disrepair, was found to be taking on water. The departure was postponed while the men, aided by the locals, attempted to find and repair the leak. When these attempts were unsuccessful, it was decided that the Victoria would leave for Spain via a western route, and that the Trinidad would remain behind for some time to be refitted, before heading back to Spain by an eastern route, involving an overland passage across the American continent. Several weeks later, Trinidad departed and attempted to return to Spain via the Pacific route. This attempt failed. Trinidad was captured by the Portuguese, and was eventually wrecked in a storm while at anchor under Portuguese control.

Return to Spain
The Victoria set sail via the Indian Ocean route home on 21 December 1521, commanded by Juan Sebastián Elcano. By 6 May 1522 the Victoria rounded the Cape of Good Hope, with only rice for rations. Twenty crewmen died of starvation by 9 July 1522, when Elcano put into Portuguese Cape Verde for provisions. The crew was surprised to learn that the date was actually 10 July 1522, a day after their own meticulous records indicated. They had no trouble making purchases at first, using the cover story that they were returning to Spain from the Americas. However, the Portuguese detained 13 crew members after discovering that Victoria was carrying spices from the East Indies. The Victoria managed to escape with its cargo of 26 tons of spices (cloves and cinnamon).

On 6 September 1522, Elcano and the remaining crew of Magellan's voyage arrived in Sanlúcar de Barrameda in Spain aboard Victoria, almost exactly three years after they departed. They then sailed upriver to Seville, and from there overland to Valladolid, where they appeared before the Emperor.

Survivors
When Victoria, the one surviving ship and the smallest carrack in the fleet, returned to the harbour of departure after completing the first circumnavigation of the Earth, only 18 men out of the original 270 men were on board. In addition to the returning Europeans, the Victoria had aboard three Moluccans who came aboard at Tidore.

King Charles pressed for the release of the 12 men held captive by the Portuguese in Cape Verde, and they were eventually returned to Spain in small groups over the course of the following year. They were:

Between 1525 and 1526, the survivors of the Trinidad, who had been captured by the Portuguese in the Moluccas, were transported to a prison in Portugal and eventually released after a seven-month negotiation. Only five survived:

The following five nonsurvivors are considered to have successfully circumnavigated, since they died after the Victoria and Trinidad had crossed the tracks of the outbound fleet.

Accounts of voyage

Antonio Pigafetta's journal, later published as Relazione del primo viaggio intorno al mondo, is the main primary source for much of what is known about Magellan's expedition. The first published report of the circumnavigation was a letter written by Maximilianus Transylvanus, a relative of sponsor Cristóbal de Haro, who interviewed survivors in 1522 and published his account in 1523 under the title De Moluccis Insulis...''. Initially published in Latin, other editions later appeared in Italian, Spanish, and English.

In addition, there is an extant chronicle from Peter Martyr d'Anghiera, which was written in Spanish in 1522 or 1523, misplaced, then published again in 1530.

Another reliable secondary source is the 1601 chronicle and the longer 1615 version, both by Spanish historian Antonio de Herrera y Tordesillas. Herrera's account is all the more accurate as he had access to Spanish and Portuguese sources that are nowhere to be found today, not least Andrés de San Martín's navigational notes and papers. San Martin, the chief pilot-cosmographer (astrologer) of the Armada, disappeared in the Cebu massacre on 1 May 1521.

In addition to Pigafetta's surviving journal, 11 other crew members kept written accounts of the voyage:
 Francisco Albo: the Victoria's pilot logbook ("Diario ó derrotero"), first referred to in 1788, and first published in its entirety in 1837 and a deposition on 18 October 1522
 Martín de Ayamonte: a short account first published in 1933
 Giovanni Battista: two letters dating from the 21 December 1521 and 25 October 1525 respectively
 Hernando de Bustamante: a deposition on 18 October 1522
 Juan Sebastián Elcano: a letter written on 6 September 1522 and a deposition on 18 October 1522
 Gonzalo Gómez de Espinosa: a letter written on 12 January 1525, a statement on 2 August 1527 and a deposition from the 2nd to the 5 September 1527
 Ginés de Mafra: a detailed account first published in 1920, a statement on 2 August 1527 and a deposition from 2 to 5 September 1527
 Martín Méndez : the Victoria's logbook
 Leone Pancaldo: a long logbook 'by the Genoese pilot' (first published in 1826), a letter written on 25 October 1525, a statement on 2 August 1527 and a deposition from 2 to 5 September 1527
 an anonymous Portuguese crew member: a long manuscript, first published in 1937, known as "the Leiden manuscript", possibly written by Gonzalo Gómez de Espinosa and, in all likelihood, a Trinidad crew member
 and another anonymous Portuguese crew member: a very short account, first published in 1554, written by a Trinidad crew member

Legacy
Subsequent expeditions
Since there was not a set limit to the east, in 1524 both kingdoms had tried to find the exact location of the antimeridian of Tordesillas, which would divide the world into two equal hemispheres and to resolve the "Moluccas issue". A board met several times without reaching an agreement: the knowledge at that time was insufficient for an accurate calculation of longitude, and each gave the islands to their sovereign.

In 1525, soon after the return of Magellan's expedition, Charles V sent an expedition led by García Jofre de Loaísa to occupy the Moluccas, claiming that they were in his zone of the Treaty of Tordesillas. This expedition included the most notable Spanish navigators, including Juan Sebastián Elcano, who, along with many other sailors, died during the voyage, and the young Andrés de Urdaneta. They had difficulty reaching the Moluccas, docking at Tidore. The Portuguese were already established in nearby Ternate and the two nations had nearly a decade of skirmishing over the possession, which was still occupied by indigenous people. An agreement was reached only with the Treaty of Zaragoza, signed on 1529 between Spain and Portugal. It assigned the Moluccas to Portugal and the Philippines to Spain.

In 1565, Andrés de Urdaneta discovered the Manila-Acapulco route.

The course that Magellan charted was later followed by other navigators, such as Sir Francis Drake during his circumnavigation in 1578. In 1960, the route was retraced completely submerged (with minor variations in course) by USS Triton.

Scientific accomplishments
Magellan's expedition was the first to circumnavigate the globe and the first to navigate the strait in South America connecting the Atlantic and the Pacific oceans. Magellan's name for the Pacific was adopted by other Europeans.

Magellan's crew observed several animals that were entirely new to European science, including a "camel without humps", which was probably a guanaco, whose range extends to Tierra del Fuego. The llama, vicuña and alpaca natural ranges were in the Andes mountains. A black "goose" that had to be skinned instead of plucked was a penguin.

The full extent of the globe was realised, since their voyage was 14,460 Spanish leagues (60,440 km or 37,560 mi). The global expedition showed the need for an International Date Line to be established. Upon arrival at Cape Verde, the crew was surprised to learn that the ship's date of 9 July 1522 was one day behind the local date of 10 July 1522, even though they had recorded every day of the three-year journey without omission. They lost one day because they travelled west during their circumnavigation of the globe, in the same direction as the apparent motion of the sun across the sky. Although the Kurdish geographer Abu'l-Fida (1273–1331) had predicted that circumnavigators would accumulate a one-day offset, Cardinal Gasparo Contarini was the first European to give a correct explanation of the discrepancy.

Quincentenary
In 2017, Portugal submitted an application to UNESCO to honour the circumnavigation route; the proposal was for a World Heritage Site called "Route of Magellan".
In 2019 this was replaced by a joint application on the part of Portugal and Spain.

In 2019, there have been a number of events to mark the 500th anniversary of the voyage including exhibitions in various Spanish cities.

In line with the 500th celebration of Magellan's arrival in the Philippines on 2021, the National Quincentennial Committee will put up shrine markers to the points where the fleet anchored.

See also

 Age of Discovery
 Timeline of the Magellan expedition
 Chronology of European exploration of Asia
 History of the Philippines
 Military history of the Philippines
 Spanish colonization attempt of the Strait of Magellan
 Spanish Empire
 Magallanica, hypothetical continent south of the Strait of Magellan

Notes

References

Citations

BibliographyEnglish 
 
 
  https://archive.org/details/notesonnaturalhi00cunn/page/117
 https://www.tandfonline.com/doi/abs/10.1080/00223340802303611
 
 
 
 
 French 
 
  http://www.lecfc.fr/new/articles/216-article-10.pdf
 
  https://books.google.com/books?id=y3jE2UlAyjcC&pg=PP1Portuguese 
  https://www.youtube.com/watch?v=XT9IbAfkWsQ
 https://trove.nla.gov.au/work/11453290?q&versionId=13442781
 Spanish'
  Historia de las Indias (vol. 3 de 5) - Bartolomé De Las Casas (in Spanish)
  Colección de documentos inéditos para la historia de Chile: desde el viaje de Magallanes hasta la batalla de Maipo: 1518-1818: tomo 7 - Memoria Chilena
 .

External links
 
  Primera vuelta al mundo Magallanes-Elcano. V Centenario. Official site for the 5th centenary of the expedition.

 
1519 in Spain
1520
1521 in the Philippines
1522 in Spain
Circumnavigations
Expeditions from Spain
Exploration of South America
1510s in South America
1520s in South America
History of Guam
Maluku Islands
Spanish exploration in the Age of Discovery
Spanish Navy